Taapsee Pannu (born 1 August 1987) is an Indian actress who works primarily in Hindi, Telugu and Tamil films. Known for her roles in female-led films, she is the recipient of several accolades including three Filmfare Awards. 

After a brief modelling career, Pannu ventured into acting with the Telugu film Jhummandi Naadam (2010) and then entered Tamil cinema with the critically and commercially acclaimed Aadukalam (2011). She subsequently appeared in notable Tamil and Telugu films like Mr. Perfect (2011), Sahasam (2013), Arrambam (2013), Kanchana 2 (2015), Ghazi (2017), and Game Over (2019).

In Hindi films she debuted in 2013 with the comedy film Chashme Baddoor. She later worked in Hindi films such as Baby (2015), Pink (2016), Naam Shabana (2017), The Ghazi Attack (2017), Judwaa 2 (2017), Mulk (2018), Manmarziyaan (2018), Badla (2019), Mission Mangal (2019), Saand Ki Aankh (2019), Thappad (2020), Haseen Dillruba (2021), Rashmi Rocket (2021), Looop Lapeta(2022), Dobaaraa (2022) and Blurr (2022), she produced the last film.

Apart from acting, Pannu runs an event management company called The Wedding Factory. She is also the owner of the badminton franchise Pune 7 Aces, which plays in the Premier Badminton League.

Early life 
Taapsee Pannu was born on 1 August 1987 in New Delhi to Dilmohan Singh Pannu and Nirmaljeet. She is a Jat Sikh. Her father is a retired real estate agent while her mother is a homemaker. She also has a younger sister, Shagun. She did her schooling at the Mata Jai Kaur Public School in Ashok Vihar and studied Computer Science Engineering at the Guru Tegh Bahadur Institute of Technology.

After graduating, Pannu worked as a software engineer. She became a full-time model after she auditioned and was selected for Channel V's 2008 talent show Get Gorgeous, which eventually led her to acting. Pannu has been appearing in numerous print and television commercials and won several titles during her modelling days, including "Pantaloons Femina Miss Fresh Face" and "Safi Femina Miss Beautiful Skin" at the 2008 Femina Miss India contest.

As a model, she endorsed brands such as Reliance Trends, Red FM 93.5, UniStyle Image, Coca-Cola, Motorola, Pantaloon, PVR Cinemas, Standard Chartered Bank, Dabur, Airtel, Tata Docomo, World Gold Council, Havells and Vardhman. After a few years, she lost interest in modeling as she thought that she could never gain proper recognition through modelling, but only through films, and finally decided to act.

Career

2010–2015: Early work 
Pannu made her cinematic debut in 2010 with K. Raghavendra Rao's romantic musical Jhummandi Naadam. She played the role of the daughter of a USA–based millionaire who comes to India to research traditional Telugu music. Pannu got three more offers in Telugu prior to the film's release. Her next film Aadukalam (2011), marked her debut in Tamil cinema. She played the role of an Anglo-Indian girl falling in love with a rural man played by Dhanush. The film, set in the backdrop of Madurai, revolves around cockfights. It was critically acclaimed and proceeded to win six National Film Awards at the 58th National Film Awards. Speaking about her role, a reviewer from Sify said: "Debutant Taapsee is a promising find and she suits the character of an Anglo-Indian girl to the T." She returned to the Telugu film industry with Vastadu Naa Raju (2011), opposite Vishnu Manchu. She made a foray into Malayalam cinema later that year, with Doubles (2011), opposite Mammootty and Nadiya Moidu. Paresh C Palicha of Rediff commented: "Taapsee Pannu as Saira Banu, whose entry into the scene becomes the bone of contention between the siblings, has nothing noteworthy to do".

Pannu played a short role in her next release Mr. Perfect (2011). In it, she acted alongside Prabhas and Kajal Aggarwal. She starred in a high-budget film titled Veera (2011), opposite Ravi Teja and Kajal Aggarwal, which received moderate reviews. She was next seen in her second Tamil film Vandhaan Vendraan, that fetched mixed reviews and did not fare well at the box office. Her next film was Krishna Vamsi's Mogudu where she acted as a traditional Telugu girl opposite Gopichand and garnered critical acclaim for her performance. She worked on several Telugu films at this time including Gundello Godari, Daruvu, and Shadow.

In 2013, Pannu made her Hindi film debut with David Dhawan's Chashme Baddoor, co-starring Siddharth, Rishi Kapoor, Divyendu Sharma and Ali Zafar. A remake of the eponymous 1981 film, it met with unanimous negative reviews but became a box-office success. Later, she was seen in the big budget action thriller Arrambam co-starring Ajith Kumar, Nayanthara and Arya. She was awarded Most Enthusiastic Performer–Female Award at the 2014 Edison Awards for her performance in the film.

After a year without releases, she was noted for her supporting role in Akshay Kumar in Neeraj Pandey's film Baby (2015), as undercover agent Shabana Khan. Later, she had two Tamil releases, the horror comedy Muni 3, opposite Raghava Lawrence and Aishwarya R. Dhanush's Vai Raja Vai, which featured her in a special appearance.

2016–2019: Breakthrough in Hindi films
While filming for Running Shaadi, Pannu was approached by Shoojit Sircar for the courtroom drama Pink. She was "curious and excited" about the subject as it had not "been dealt with head-on yet in mainstream cinema." The film, which also starred Amitabh Bachchan, Kirti Kulhari and Andrea Tariang, followed three girls who fight a case against a politician's nephew for molestation. The film and Pannu's performance received positive reviews. Rajeev Masand noted that Pannu, along with other two ladies, "deliver natural performances as strong but emotionally vulnerable women, without a hint of affectation." Pannu later said that the film proved to be a turning point in her career.

Pannu's first release of 2017 was the romantic comedy Running Shaadi, where she played a Punjabi girl who helps couples in eloping to get married. The film received mixed critical reception but praised her acting. It was followed by the naval war drama The Ghazi Attack, based on the mysterious sinking of PNS Ghazi during the Indo-Pakistani War of 1971. The film was shot simultaneously in Telugu and Hindi and performed modestly at the box-office. Pandey noticed that Pannu's seven-eight minute sequence in the role of special agent Shabana Khan in Baby was well received after which he "decided to give the story an arc." Pannu reprised her role in its spin-off titled, Naam Shabana. For the role, she trained in different forms of mixed martial arts like Kūdō and Krav Maga. Both the film and Pannu's performance met with mixed response with Sarita A. Tanwar of Daily News and Analysis noting that she is "fantastic in every scene" and Udita Jhunjhunwala of Mint felt that she is "hardly likable" in the film. Pannu subsequent roles were of a ghost in Telugu horror comedy film Anando Brahma and the protagonist's girlfriend in the action-comedy Judwaa 2.

Dil Juunglee (2018), co-starring Saqib Saleem, was Pannu's first release of the year. It failed to create an impact among the critics and the audience. Her followup was Shaad Ali's sports drama Soorma which was based on the life of field hockey player Sandeep Singh (played by Diljit Dosanjh). Despite mixed reviews, Soorma became a financial success. Pannu then depicted a lawyer in Anubhav Sinha's Mulk. Pannu said that the film presents true patriotism and nationalism without taking sides. Pannu's performance was praised with Nandini Ramnath of Scroll.in calling her one of the "strong turns" of the film; it earned her a Filmfare Award for Best Actress (Critics) nomination.

After playing the role of an antagonist in the Telugu action thriller Neevevaro, Pannu played the central role of Rumi Bagga, a free-spirited girl caught in a love triangle, in Anurag Kashyap's romantic drama Manmarziyaan alongside Abhishek Bachchan and Vicky Kaushal. The film premiered at 2018 Toronto International Film Festival to a positive critical reception, including for Pannu's performance. Anupama Chopra called her performance "mercurial and mysterious and maddening": "With her cloud of red hair enveloping her, Rumi seems, continually to be a woman on a warpath." The same year, she also acted in two short films: Baarish aur Chowmein and Nitishastra.

2019–present: Established actress 

Pannu had a string of releases in 2019 with the first one being Sujoy Ghosh's mystery thriller Badla, an official remake of the 2016 Spanish film The Invisible Guest. It also marked her second collaboration with Amitabh Bachchan. She was initially offered a supporting role and the film had a male lead. Pannu convinced the producer to have the lead role played by a female which he agreed on and offered her the role. Badla met with positive reviews, as did Pannu's performance as Naina Sethi, a shrewd businesswoman. In her review of the film, film critic Namrata Joshi mentioned that Pannu is "in fine form"; the film met with strong box-office results.

Pannu then essayed the role of a game designer who uses a wheelchair and battles a home invasion in the psychological thriller Game Over, directed by Ashwin Saravanan. The film was shot simultaneously in Tamil and Telugu language. During the duration of the filming, Pannu had to be in a wheelchair for 12 hours for 25 days. The film and her performance were praised; Saibal Chatterjee said that Pannu "is never less than convincing" and "may be the primary reason why you must go out a watch this film."

She next played an ISRO scientist in the space drama Mission Mangal which was about India's first interplanetary expedition, Mars Orbiter Mission. Pannu liked the idea of a space film with several leading ladies in it. Her final film of the year was Tushar Hiranandani's biographical film Saand Ki Aankh, co-starring Bhumi Pednekar. Pannu portrayed the role of Prakashi Tomar who is one of the world's oldest sharpshooters for which she underwent three months of training in pistol shooting. Her role was well received with Anna M. M. Vetticad writing that both Pannu and Pednekar succeed in "delivering equally finely tuned, sensitive performances." Pannu and Pednekar received the Filmfare Critics Award for Best Actress.

Pannu's sole release of 2020 was Anubhav Sinha's social drama Thappad, where she played the role of Amrita, a home-maker who files for divorce after her husband slaps her. She said that the character's "righteousness, her maturity to handle every situation" made her suffocate. The film and Pannu's performance met with critical acclaim. Shubhra Gupta of The Indian Express noted that she "drives the film, but the effort she puts into her performance shows." Pannu was awarded with the Filmfare Award for Best Actress and received a Filmfare Critics Award for Best Actress nomination.

Pannu's first releasee of 2021 was the romantic murder mystery Haseen Dillruba opposite Vikrant Massey. The film premiered on 2 July 2021 on Netflix and emerged as the most-watched Hindi film on the platform that year. Both the film and Pannu's performance were however poorly received by critics, with Rohan Naahar from Hindustan Times calling it a "hot mess" and describing it as "illogical" and "ill-conceived" while adding that "Pannu’s performance as a bored housewife named Rani is all over the place". Film critic Shubhra Gupta from Indian Express stated "Pannu's delivery in her films remains same, only the costume changes" 

She then appeared in the Tamil-language horror comedy Annabelle Sethupathi opposite Vijay Sethupathi. Her final film of the year was Rashmi Rocket, a sports drama that tells a story of an Indian track and field athlete who was subject to gender testing due to being diagnosed with hyperandrogenism. Ronak Kotecha of The Times of India commented, “Pannu once again proves her mettle. Her effort to celebrate Rashmi’s victory and endure her pain, is as real as it gets and the actress doesn't miss the beat when it comes to making us root for her character.”

In July 2021, she signed Telugu film Mishan Impossible directed by Swaroop RSJ. It is her comeback film in Telugu film industry after Anando Brahma in 2017. The film is slated to release on 1 April 2022. 

In 2022, Pannu starred in Looop Lapeta, an official remake of the 1998 German film Run Lola Run. It released online on 4 February 2022 on Netflix. She went on to receive Filmfare OTT Awards for Best Actress in a Web Original.  She next starred in the film directed by Srijit Mukherji, based on the life of former Test and ODI captain of the India women's national cricket team, Mithali Raj, titled Shabaash Mithu, it upon release got panned by critics and audience and emerged as big disaster at the box-office. Her next film of this year was Dobaaraa, which was remake of 2018 Spanish thriller movie Mirage (2018), her second collaboration with director Anurag Kashyap
In December her film Blurr got released online on Zee5 mobile app, it is a remake of Spanish thriller film Julia's Eyes (2010). It is Tapsee's second Spanish film remake after Dobaara (2022).

In the media 

She was featured for a second time in 2019 ranking 68th. In 2017, she was featured in the magazine's 30 Under 30 list. She was ranked in The Times Most Desirable Women at No. 36 in 2019, at No. 23 in 2020.

Pannu runs an event management company called The Wedding Factory which she manages along with her sister Shagun and friend Farah Parvaresh. In 2018, she bought the badminton franchise Pune 7 Aces which plays in the Premier Badminton League.

In 2019, Pannu raised awareness about children's health, and gender parity on Twitter with hashtag #WhyTheGap. Pannu has also served as the brand ambassador for Uber, Garnier, Nivea, Kurkure and Women's Horlicks.

On december 24, 2022 she attends NDTV's show "Jai Jawan" and tested her mettle.

Accolades

See also 
 List of Indian film actresses 
 Women in India
 Cinema of India 
 Hindi cinema

References

External links 
 
 

1987 births
Living people
Actresses in Tamil cinema
Indian film actresses
Actresses in Telugu cinema
Actresses in Malayalam cinema
Female models from Delhi
21st-century Indian actresses
Actresses in Hindi cinema
Indian beauty pageant winners
Actresses from New Delhi
Filmfare Awards winners
Screen Awards winners
Zee Cine Awards winners